The 2007 FEI European Dressage Championships, was the 25th edition of the European Dressage Championship. It was held at La Mandria in Turin, Italy, from August 30 to September 2, 2007.

Events

Dressage

Individual freestyle

Individual special

Team

Medal summary

Medal table

Medalists

References

European Dressage Championships
Equestrian sports competitions in Italy